The Archéoforum is an archaeological museum on place Saint-Lambert in Liège in Belgium. It is centered on the ruins of Saint Lambert's Cathedral and also includes the remains of a Gallo-Roman villa as well as displaying objects from the Mesolithic onward.

Sources
http://www.archeoforumdeliege.be/Page_Generale.asp?DocID=17667

Archaeological museums in Belgium
Museums in Liège (city)
2003 establishments in Belgium
Museums established in 2003